Michael Vitzthum (born 20 June 1992) is a German former footballer who played as a left back.

He played in the youth teams of Bayern Munich, before leaving to join SpVgg Unterhaching in 2010. In October of that year, he made his professional debut, as a substitute for Roman Tyce in a 1–1 draw with Kickers Offenbach.

For the 2012–13 season he moved to VfB Stuttgart II. He was loaned out to Karlsruher SC from July 2013 to June 2014 after his contract with VfB Stuttgart was extended.

For the 2014–15 season Vitzthum moved to 1. FC Heidenheim.

References

External links

1992 births
Living people
German footballers
Germany youth international footballers
Germany under-21 international footballers
SpVgg Unterhaching players
VfB Stuttgart II players
VfB Stuttgart players
Karlsruher SC players
1. FC Heidenheim players
SV Wehen Wiesbaden players
SG Sonnenhof Großaspach players
2. Bundesliga players
3. Liga players
Association football fullbacks
SpVgg Unterhaching II players
People from Bad Tölz
Sportspeople from Upper Bavaria
Footballers from Bavaria